Dora Joan Potter (1915–1987) was an Australian children's author. She is best remembered for her novels set in the fictional Winterton girls boarding school.

She worked as a secretary at the University of Adelaide, became an expert maths typist, and retired in 1976. She never married and died from cancer on 5 February 1987 at Fulham, South Australia.

Her books were popular in their time.

Bibliography
 Pam Pays Her Debt (1945)
 Those Summer Holidays (1946)
 Margaret's Decision (1947)
 Helen's Inheritance (1950)

Winterton School series
 With Wendy at Winterton School (1945)
 Wendy Moves Up (1947)
 Wendy in Charge (1947)
 Althea's Term at Winterton (1948)
 Winterton Holiday Cruise (1949)
 A New Girl for Winterton (1950)

References

External links

 https://web.archive.org/web/20130115145705/http://www.bonzaschooldays.com/2009/08/dora-joan-potter-joan-potter.html

1915 births
1987 deaths
Australian children's writers